Patayin sa Sindak si Barbara is a 1995 Philippine psychological horror film directed by Chito S. Roño and written by Ricardo Lee. It is a remake of the 1974 horror film by Celso Ad. Castillo.

Plot
Being the loving older sister, Barbara (Lorna Tolentino) has always been overly indulgent of her little sister Ruth's every whim. Years later, Barbara meets and instantly falls in love with Nick (Tonton Gutierrez), who is mutually smitten with her. But the spoiled Ruth (Dawn Zulueta) confesses to her older sister that she too is in love with Nick and threatens to kill herself if he does not marry her. So with a heavy heart, Barbara once again passively accommodates Ruth's demands and convinces Nick to court her younger sister instead. In a twisted act of devotion, Nick reluctantly agrees to marry Ruth, to prove his love for Barbara. After the wedding, Barbara then decides to start a new life abroad, to give Nick a chance to truly fall in love with Ruth and for Barbara to get over her feelings for him.

Her past comes back to haunt her (in more ways than one) when Barbara receives news that her younger sister has killed herself and was witnessed by Ruth's only daughter Karen (Antoinette Taus). Barbara immediately returns to the Philippines to mourn her sister and comfort her unstable niece. But strange events happen upon Barbara's return and she learns the reason surrounding Ruth's mysterious death.

Throughout their marriage, Ruth felt that Nick never really loved her, but instead still harboured feelings for her sister. In a state of paranoid delusion, she suspects that Nick was having an affair and used his business trips to the United States as an excuse to rendezvous with Barbara. In a jealous rage, she commits suicide and haunts the household and everyone she deemed who have wronged her. It was later revealed that ever since Barbara left her for the US, she indulged herself of everything that can ease her helplessness which includes witchcraft and spiritual medium sessions. Through this she learned that even after death she can return to the world of the living on a limited time to haunt and exact revenge on anyone she wants.

Maestra Beatriz, whom Barbara sought advise and also was responsible for teaching Ruth black magic offered help and have tried to make contact with her tormented soul via spiritual session together with Barbara and her maid. During this session Ruth possessed her only child and manages to kill the old woman. Through an act of sacrifice, Maestra Beatriz manages to drive away Ruth's spirit. All seems well, until Barbara and Nick learned that what happened during Barbara's encounter with Ruth's spirit was only temporary and now, since it was the 9th day of Ruth's passing, she now have grown more powerful and with the help of evil spirits whom she now have given purpose.

Ruth appears and manages to convince Barbara to join her in the world of the tormented souls until Nick arrives just in time and instead sacrificed himself by holding the physical manifestation of Ruth and plunging both themselves to the fiery pits of hell.

Cast

Main roles
Lorna Tolentino as Barbara
Dawn Zulueta as Ruth Duarte
Tonton Gutierrez as Nick Duarte
Antoinette Taus as Karen Duarte
Anita Linda as Yaya Benita
Amy Austria as Arlene
Nonie Buencamino as Bidoy
Angie Ferro as Maestra Beatriz

Supporting roles
Eva Aquino as Sofia
Ernie Zarate as Priest
Augusto Victa as Lawyer
Cris Daluz as Bangkero
Kimberly Pagaduan Cabral as Dawn's Double

Production
The majority of the visual effects used in the film were handled by Cinevideo Arts Philippines. Digital compositing was handled by Video Post.

Restoration
As part of the projects of the ABS-CBN Film Archives, the movie is one of the classic Filipino films that were digitally restored and remastered in HD. A special screening of the restored HD version of the film was held on April 6, 2016, at the UP Cine Adarna.

See also
Patayin Mo Sa Sindak Si Barbara – a 1974 Filipino film
Patayin Sa Sindak Si Barbara (TV series) – a Filipino TV series based on the 1974 film

References

External links

1995 films
1995 horror films
Films directed by Chito S. Roño
Horror film remakes
Remakes of Philippine films
Philippine horror films
Films about spirit possession
Star Cinema films
1990s Tagalog-language films